Tebnin SC, sometimes Tebnine SC is a Lebanese sports club most known for its basketball program. It originates in Tebnine, Tyre District, Lebanon.

Tebnin SC basketball team is part of the Lebanese Basketball League in division A after quickly ascending the 4 divisions in the league and presently the only team representing South Governorate of Lebanon in the top league. It plays its home games in the Cité Sportive indoor stadium in the Beirut's southern suburbs. Tebnin SC withdrew from the division A in the 2009-10 season, the team is relegated along with Blue Stars (Lebanon) who withdrew also to Division 1.
They promised a triumphant return to the division A in the 2011-2012. Tebnine's manager, Rami Fawaz, promised to build a strong team.

Notable players
 Ghaleb Rida

External links
Tebnin SC Basketball Official website

Basketball teams in Lebanon
Tyre District